Comte. Antonio Amilton Beraldo Airport , formerly SSZW and called Sant'Ana Airport, is the airport serving Ponta Grossa, Brazil.

It is operated by the Municipality of Ponta Grossa under the supervision of Aeroportos do Paraná (SEIL).

Airlines and destinations

Accidents and incidents
15 March 1961: a Aeronorte Douglas DC-3 registration PP-YQS operating a flight from São Paulo had to divert to Ponta Grossa because of bad weather at the intended destination. The aircraft crashed into a hill while approaching the runway. Three crew members died.

Access

See also

List of airports in Brazil

References

External links

Airports in Paraná (state)
Ponta Grossa